Malta Command was an independent command of the British Army. It commanded all army units involved in the defence of Malta. Once mobilised the Command deployed its headquarters to underground hardened shelters and its combat units were deployed to fixed points in the Maltese countryside, from where they operated from. This mobilised, but largely static army garrison would be tested by aerial bombardment and naval blockade during the Second World War. Whilst Malta Command was already a functioning command structure before 1939, it had existed in the Great War and was specifically mentioned in a House of Commons debate of 12 February 1917; the Second World War would see the Command operate as a genuine war-fighting headquarters, albeit in a static defensive role.

On 15 April 1942 the Island of Malta was awarded the George Cross by King George VI in recognition of the stalwart defence and fortitude of service personnel and civilians against a much more powerful Axis foe. Malta an Island of only 117 square miles had been more heavily bombed than London had been during their blitz.

World War 1 and the Interwar Years 
There is evidence that Malta Command existed in 1916, 1917 and in 1929.

Between 1935 and 1936 the following infantry battalions were on the Island and part of Malta Command:
 2nd Battalion The Lincolnshire Regiment
 2nd Battalion The Rifle Brigade
 1st Battalion The King's Own Scottish Borderers.

1939 - the Peacetime Garrison Transitions to War 
Malta's garrison was a single infantry brigade; comprising  the 2nd Battalion the Devonshire Regiment, 2nd Battalion the Queen's Own Royal West Kent Regiment, 1st Battalion the Dorsetshire Regiment and the 2nd Battalion the Royal Irish Fusiliers. An infantry territorial unit was also present, the 1st Battalion The King's Own Malta Regiment. The Malta garrison's artillery was largely fixed and consisted of light and heavy anti-aircraft; and coastal defence artillery regiments drawn from the Royal Artillery (RA) and Royal Malta Artillery (RMA). The Royal Engineers were also in evidence with British and Maltese serving in the Corps on the Island.

The Reinforced Army Garrison 
On 11 March 1942 Malta Command became subordinate to General Headquarters (GHQ) Middle East.

Infantry 
In late 1939 the pre-war garrison was reinforced up to an infantry division (commanded by Major General Sir Sanford John Palairet Scobell). The original infantry garrison, plus the three brigades that reinforced the island's regular British Army were titled 1, 2, 3, and 4 Brigades; but were subsequently renumbered in 1943 as follows:
 231 Infantry Brigade – assigned to the Southern Sector under Brig L H Cox. HQ Southern Infantry Brigade at Luqa. Its infantry battalions were:
 2nd Battalion The Devonshire Regiment
 1st Battalion The Hampshire Regiment
 1st Battalion The Dorsetshire Regiment
 2nd Battalion The King’s Own Malta Regiment
 3rd Battalion The King’s Own Malta Regiment
 232 Infantry Brigade – assigned to the Northern Sector under Brig W H Oxley. HQ Northern Infantry Brigade at Melita Hotel Attard next to San Anton Gardens. Its infantry battalions were:
 2nd Battalion, Royal Irish Fusiliers
 8th Battalion, King's Own Royal Regiment (Lancaster)
 8th Battalion, Manchester Regiment
 233 Infantry Brigade – formed on 30 July 1941; assigned to the Central Sector under Brig I De La Bere. Its infantry battalions were:
 11th Battalion The Lancashire Fusiliers
 2nd Battalion The Queen’s Own Royal West Kent Regiment
 10th Battalion The King’s Own Malta Regiment
 234 Infantry Brigade – assigned to the Western sector under Brig F Brittorous. Its infantry battalions were:
 4th Battalion The Royal East Kent Regiment (The Buffs)
 1st Battalion The Durham Light Infantry
 1st Battalion The Cheshire Regiment

Light Support Weapons 

Personal weapons such as the .303-in SMLE, 9mm Sten or .38 service revolver are not included in this study.

Artillery 
 The Island's regular Royal Artillery force component was like its Maltese counterpart performing a mainly fixed defence role, even wheeled artillery tended to occupy fixed positions to defend against a hostile landing at beaches:
 4th Coast Regiment, RA made up of (a HQ Battery, 6th, 10th & 23rd Coast Batteries)
 12th Field Regiment RA - initially equipped with 18 Pounder Field Guns, but later equipped with 25 Pounder Field Guns (the only real mobile artillery support for the infantry brigades).
 26th Defence Regiment, RA made up of (a HQ Battery, 15th/40th & 48th/71st Defence Batteries).
 The Royal Malta Artillery
 Headquarters, RMA
 1st Coast Regiment, RMA composed of (a HQ Battery, 1st, 2nd, 3rd & 4th Heavy Batteries)

The anti-aircraft defence was understandably dense and British and Maltese anti-aircraft (AA) units were interwoven into the following ORBAT:

 7th Anti-Aircraft Brigade
 32nd Light Anti-Aircraft Regiment RA
 65th Light Anti-Aircraft Regiment RA
 74th Light Anti-Aircraft Regiment RA
 3rd Light Anti-Aircraft Regiment RMA
 4th Searchlight Regiment RA/RMA
 10th Anti-Aircraft Brigade
 4th Heavy Anti-Aircraft Regiment RA
 7th Heavy Anti-Aircraft Regiment RA
 10th Heavy Anti-Aircraft Regiment RA
 2nd Heavy Anti-Aircraft Regiment RMA
 11th Heavy Anti-Aircraft Battery RMA.

Heavy Support Weapons 
By 1940 Malta Command had a small amount of modern mobile field artillery, much of its artillery was located in fixed positions in the anti-aircraft and coastal defence royal. It was manned by members of the Royal Artillery and Royal Malta Artillery.

For details of fixed artillery see Royal Malta Artillery's equipment list.

Royal Armoured Corps 
 Malta Tanks (Royal Tank Regiment) - less than a full battalion of various reconnaissance and infantry support tanks.

Armour on Island 
By 1942 Malta Command Tanks had a small mixed force of Royal Tank Regiment tanks known as "Malta Tanks" during its time on the Island. The only other armoured vehicles were the Universal Carriers of the infantry units.

Combat & Service Support Units 

 Royal Engineers
 16th Fortress Company
 24th Fortress Company
 173rd Tunnel Company
 2 Works Company
 127th Bomb Disposal Section
 128th Bomb Disposal Section
 Malta Command Signals, Royal Signals
 8 Special Wireless Squadron
 Royal Army Medical Corps
 39 General Hospital RAMC
 45 General Hospital RAMC
 90 General Hospital RAMC
 15 Field Ambulance RAMC
 161 Field Ambulance RAMC
 69 Field Security Section Intelligence Corps
 226 Provost Company Royal Military Police
 Royal Army Service Corps
 32 Company RASC (MT)
 Malta Supply Depot RASC
 Water Transport Company RASC
 Royal Army Ordnance Corps
 A static Royal Electrical Mechanical Engineers Workshops at Pembroke Garrison
 72 Detachment Royal Army Pay Corps
 Royal Army Chaplains' Department.

Local Maltese Units (Regular and Territorial) 
Critical to the success and resilience of Malta's was local commitment and bravery the following units were fully integrated in Malta Command:
 The Royal Malta Artillery
 The King's Own Malta Regiment
 The Malta Fortress Squadron, Royal Engineers.

The War Draws to a Close and the Post War Period 
On 2 December 1944 Malta Command regained its status as an independent command and it ceased its command relationship with GHQ Middle East in Cairo. The British would remember the war in a somewhat detached and romanticised fashion in films like The Malta Story; the Maltese never had a chance to record their views being viewed as 'plucky' citizens of a British colony. 

In 1954 Headquarters Malta Command occupied the Auberge de Castille, known locally as "The Castille". British Troops Malta became again part of Middle East Land Forces in 1960. 

Forces in Maltawould be reduced from 1964 and this led to acrimony between the Maltese and British Governments, and the post independence period was a period of bitterness, British forces on the Island in the front line of Maltese antipathy. Major-General Henry Hovell-Thurlow-Cumming-Bruce, 7th Baron Thurlow commanded in 1962-63. In 1965, 4th (Leicestershire) Battalion the Royal Anglian Regiment arrived to join Malta Garrison at St. Patrick's Barracks on the north coast of Malta. Under Brigadier Lord Grimthorpe OBE, Malta Garrison consisted of 4 R Anglian; 1 Battalion The Loyal Regiment; 1st Regiment Royal Malta Artillery (partially a transport regiment); and 1st Battalion King's Own Malta Regiment (TA). 

Malta Garrison was in turn responsible to HQ Malta and Libya, under Major-General J D Frost, with the other components being HQ Cyrenaica Area and HQ Tripolitania Area in Libya. Later, Major General Rea Leakey commanded HQ Malta and Libya in 1967-68.

Malta Command was largely wound up by 1977 with all major units repatriated to the UK. Salerno Company of 41 Commando Royal Marines finally left the island aboard a Royal Fleet Auxiliary Sir Lancelot Landing Ship Logistic on 31 March 1979.

See also
 Siege of Malta (World War II)
 Lascaris War Rooms
 Operation Herkules
 Royal Signals in Malta
 Middle East Command
 Malta Story (the film)
 Operation Husky
 British Army during the Second World War

External links
 Malta at War Museum
 Lascaris War Rooms, Valletta
 Imperial War Museum Photographic Archive
 A Malta-based living history group keeping the RMA's heritage alive

References

Commands of the British Army
Military units and formations disestablished in the 1970s
Malta in World War II
Military history of Malta